Kleive is a village in Molde Municipality in Møre og Romsdal county, Norway. Kleive Church is located in the village. 

References

Molde
Villages in Møre og Romsdal